Stone Corral Creek refers to three streams in California and one in Oregon:

 Stone Corral Creek (Colusa County, California)
 Stone Corral Creek (Napa County, California)
 Stone Corral Creek (Ventura County, California)
 Stone Corral Creek (Harney, Oregon)